Water-Ma-Trout is a road and an industrial estate on the northern edge of Helston in west Cornwall, England.

Theories about its name are:
That its name started as Cornish dialect English for "wet my throat", here used as a name for a dry field.
Earlier: that this name is a corruption of "waterman route", due to it being near the water supply towards one of the sources of the River Cober.
That the name derives from a corruption of Welter-ma (from "wheal" and "man") and "Trout", the name of the miner.

Industry
A range of industries are based around the estate, such as the scuba gear factory AP Diving and Helston Gunsmiths.

References

External links
Google Earth view

Geography of Cornwall
Roads in Cornwall